Statistics of Swiss Super League in the 1929–30 season.

East

Table

Results

Central

Table

Results

West

Table

Results

Final

Table

Results 

|colspan="3" style="background-color:#D0D0D0" align=center|11 May 1930

|-
|colspan="3" style="background-color:#D0D0D0" align=center|18 May 1930

|-
|colspan="3" style="background-color:#D0D0D0" align=center|25 May 1930

|-
|colspan="3" style="background-color:#D0D0D0" align=center|1 June 1930

|}

Servette Genf won the championship.

Sources 
 Switzerland 1929-30 at RSSSF

Swiss Serie A seasons
Swiss
Football